In the Russian Orthodox liturgy of the 16th–18th centuries, polyphony, sometimes polyvocality, was a tradition of performing several parts of the church service in the same place at the same time; in particular, to singing several different chants simultaneously to save time. Despite being banned in favor of monophony, i.e. singing the chants one by one consecutively, it persisted for quite some time.

History
The tradition of polyphony arose in early 16th century, when chants transformed from being performed recitatively to being elaborately sung. At the same time, the strict service regimen adopted in monasteries had become the norm in ordinary churches. As a result the full church service had gradually become extremely long. Polyphony was introduced under the excuse of saving the time and stamina of laymen, however it had gradually evolved to an absurdity where, according to complaints, up to six chants were sung at the same time, with cantors trying to shout over each other. The Stoglavy Sobor had forbidden polyphony in the mid-16th century, but it continued for some time after the proscription.

References

Russian Orthodox Church in Russia
Eastern Orthodox liturgy
History of the Russian Orthodox Church